Lesle-Ann George (born 20 October 1985) is a South African field hockey player who competed in the 2008 Summer Olympics and 2012 Summer Olympics.

References

External links 
 

1985 births
Living people
South African female field hockey players
Olympic field hockey players of South Africa
Field hockey players at the 2008 Summer Olympics
Field hockey players at the 2012 Summer Olympics
Field hockey players at the 2006 Commonwealth Games
Commonwealth Games competitors for South Africa
21st-century South African women